Okakundu is a village in the Uukwaluudhi in the Tsandi Constituency in Omusati Region, Namibia. Cricketer Nasimabe Ambambi was born there.

References

Populated places in the Omusati Region